Dugna is an urban locality (a settlement) in Ferzikovsky District of Kaluga Oblast, Russia, located on the left bank of the Dugna River,  from Ferzikovo, on the main rail line between Kaluga and Tula. Population:

History
The Dugna Foundry was first mentioned in 1689. The settlement itself was founded in 1709 by Nikita Demidov, who built the first steel mills in Russia. The steel mills were built in 1715 on the site of L. Naryshkin Iron Works, founded in 1690. Now the ironworks are known as Dugna Machine Plant

Having arrived to the region in 1700, Nikita Demidov was well aware of its riches and of the importance of the steel industry for the economy of Russia. With the personal guarantee of Peter the Great, he was one of the pioneers to develop Russian domestic metallurgy and metal production. In the mid-18th century, Dugna, Brynsky, and Vyrovsky plants annually produced 19,000 poods of iron for the local market and additionally exported large quantities to St. Petersburg.  Production of iron at these three factories at that time ranged from 40 to 70 thousand poods a year, which corresponded to melting of approximately 60-100 thousand poods of iron.

Dugna was granted urban-type settlement status in 1925.

Places of interest
Peter & Paul Church (built about 1764)
Pontoon bridge over the Oka River
Steel pedestrian bridge over the Dugna River

Gallery

References

External links
Demidovs and Dugna Ironplant
Website of the Dugna Secondary School 

Rural localities in Kaluga Oblast